The 2003 Mountain West Conference  football season was the fifth since eight former members of the Western Athletic Conference banded together to form the Mountain West Conference. The Utah won the conference championship in 2003, the Utes' second overall and first outright title since the league began in 1999.

Coaching changes
Joe Glenn took over at Wyoming, replacing Vic Koenning.
Urban Meyer took over at Utah.

Bowl games

Awards
Coach of the Year: Urban Meyer, Utah
Offensive Player of the Year: QB Bradlee Van Pelt, Sr, Colorado State
Defensive Player of the Year: LB Kirk Morrison, Sr, San Diego State
Freshman of the Year: RB Lynell Hamilton, San Diego State

All Conference Team